Lange is a village in Kastre Parish, Tartu County in eastern Estonia.

Estonian Aviation Museum and Lange motocenter are located in the village.

Gallery

References

Villages in Tartu County